Sagrada Familia (Spanish meaning "Holy Family") is a Chilean town and commune in Curicó Province, Maule Region.

Demographics
Of these, 5,080 (29%) lived in urban areas and 12,439 (71%) in rural areas. The population grew by 3.7% (625 persons) between the 1992 and 2002 censuses.

Administration
As a commune, Sagrada Familia is a third-level administrative division of Chile administered by a municipal council, headed by an alcalde who is directly elected every four years. The 2008-2012 alcalde is Francisco Meléndez Rojas (PS).

Within the electoral divisions of Chile, Sagrada Familia is represented in the Chamber of Deputies by Roberto León (PDC) and Celso Morales (UDI) as part of the 36th electoral district, together with Curicó, Teno, Romeral, Molina, Hualañé, Licantén, Vichuquén and Rauco. The commune is represented in the Senate by Juan Antonio Coloma Correa (UDI) and Andrés Zaldívar Larraín (PDC) as part of the 10th senatorial constituency (Maule-North).

References

External links
  Municipality of Sagrada Familia

Populated places in Curicó Province
Communes of Chile